Balaji Dental and Craniofacial Hospital is a dental and surgical care center based in Chennai, Tamil Nadu, India. It was founded by Dr. S. M. Balaji in 1993. Balaji Dental is the premier multispecialty dental and cranio-maxillofacial hospital in Chennai, India

Various zonal assessment agencies have named it as the best dental clinic in Chennai.

Balaji Dental and Craniofacial Hospital is the first dental hospital in Chennai and second in India to introduce Cone Beam CT SCAN(Cone beam computed tomography)

Founder
Dr. S.M Balaji was the founder and director of Balaji Dental and Craniofacial Hospital. He is an international consultant maxillofacial, cleft lip and palate surgeon to many countries around the world.

Facilities
Trauma care unit
In-house dental laboratory
Ambulance and emergency services
Computerized radiography
Diagnostic services such as CBCT (Cone Beam CT Scan)
Pharmacy

Achievements
City Doc gifts Sight to Pakistan Kid - A rare, successful surgery performed by a leading dental hospital in the city, an 18-month-old Pakistani toddler from Karachi with a ‘congenital mid-facial, bilateral cleft deformity’ has not only regained his vision, but also sports an improved physical appearance now.
Life-saving jaw surgery for Chinese baby in Chennai hospital Two-year-old Chayce Lee (from Singapore), born with a rare autosomal recessive genetic disorder called Pierre Robin syndrome, a life-threatening condition with severe abnormalities affecting head and face, has been operated upon in a Chennai hospital and is out of emergency condition.

References 

Hospitals in Chennai
1993 establishments in Tamil Nadu
Hospitals established in 1993